The Charlevoix impact structure is a large eroded meteorite impact structure in the Charlevoix region of Quebec, Canada. Only part of the impact structure is exposed at the surface, the rest lying beneath the Saint Lawrence River.

Description 
The original impact structure is estimated to have been  in diameter and the age of the impact is estimated to be 450 ± 20 million years (Ordovician to Silurian age). The projectile was probably a stony asteroid, at least  in diameter, and weighing an estimated . The Mont des Éboulements, situated in the exact centre of the impact structure, is interpreted as the central uplift, a consequence of elastic rebound. The impact structure is classified as a multi-ringed basin with a central uplift.

The impact origin of Charlevoix impact structure was first realized in 1965 after the discovery of many shatter cones in the area. Other evidence for impact includes planar deformation features (PDFs) in quartz and feldspar grains.

In contrast to the surrounding craggy Laurentian Mountains, the impact structure is relatively smooth and flat, which has facilitated human settlement. Today, 90% of the people of Charlevoix live within this impact structure.

References

External links 
 Earth Impact Database
 Satellite image of the region (from Google Maps)
 Aerial Exploration of the Charlevoix Structure

Impact craters of Quebec
Ordovician impact craters
Silurian impact craters
Ordovician Quebec
Silurian Quebec
.impact structure